The year 1999 is the first year in the history of King of the Cage, a mixed martial arts promotion based in The United States. In 1999 King of the Cage held 1 event, KOTC 1: Bas Rutten's King of the Cage.

Events list

KOTC 1: Bas Rutten's King of the Cage

KOTC 1: Bas Rutten's King of the Cage was an event held on October 30, 1999, at The Soboba Casino in San Jacinto, California, United States.

Results

See also 
 King of the Cage
 List of King of the Cage events
 List of King of the Cage champions

References

King of the Cage events
1999 in mixed martial arts